Sakuntalaṃ (Sanskrit Language: Śakuntalā) is a Sanskrit language historical  film directed by Dushyanth Sridhar, a renowned speaker, writer and researcher on Indian scriptures. It is an adaptation of Kalidasa's work Abhigyaan Shakuntalam. The film is produced by Dushyanth Sridhar and Srinivas Kannaa under Desika Daya Productions. The movie stars debutants Shubham Sahrawat and Payal Shetty in the leading roles.The movie was released on 12-Aug 2022 in BookMyShow Stream OTT platform commemorating the World Sanskrit Day.

Cast and Crew 
Apart from the Director and producer, there are some key people who are associated with this film project. Rajkumar Bharati, the great-grandson of Subramania Bharathi, has composed the music while Sai Shravanam, the sound recordist of the Academy Award-winning film Life Of Pi, is the music producer for the film. Two-time National Award-winner AS Lakshminarayan has done the audiography and the editing of the film is done by five-time National Award-winner B Lenin. National Award Winner Pattanam Rasheed is the makeup artist in the film. The costume designer of the film is a Chennai-based textile designer Lakshmi Srinath.

 Payal Vijay Shetty as Sakuntala
 Shubham Jaibeer Sahrawat as Dushyanta
 Siri Chandrasekhar as Anasuya
 Subhaga Santhosh as Priyamvada
 Pavithra Srinivasan as Gautami
 Y Gee Mahendra as Kanva
 T V Varadarajan as Vaikhanasa
 Mohanram as Durvasa
 Renjith-Vijna as Vishwamitra-Menaka
 Sanjeev S as Sharngarava
 R Lakshminarayanan as Shardvata
 Raaghav Ranganathan as Madhavya
 C Lakshmi Kumar as Bhadrasena
 S M Sivakumar as Somarata
 Ramya Ramnarayan as Rajamata
 Maanas Chavali as Syala
 Govindasamy as Purusha
 K Balaji and K Bharathwaj as Tapasvi
 Shambhavi Jagadish as Tapasvini
 Dwarkesh Srivatsan as Raivataka
 Master Vishnu Kaushik as Bharata(Sarvadamana)
 C S Karthic Kumar as Suta
 Harish as Matali

Critical Response and Accolades 
At the Rajasthan International Film Festival 2022 held at Jodhpur, the movie won the Special Viewers' choice award for Best Regional Feature Film. Tejas Punia in Bollywoodlocha awarded 4 stars for the movie while saying, "Sridhar has made his debut movie in a very beautiful manner, no matter how many times you have read this work, you will want to watch this movie".

References

External links
 

Sanskrit-language films
Indian biographical drama films
Indian films based on plays
2022 drama films
2022 films